The Pakistan Automotive Manufacturers Association (PAMA) is a trade group of automobile manufacturers that operate in Pakistan.

It is the leading advocacy group for the Pakistan auto industry. Licensed by the Ministry of Commerce under the Trade Organizations Ordinance 2007.

PAMA also serves as the central source of statistical data for the automotive industry.

Members
Al-Ghazi Tractors
Al Haj Faw
Atlas Honda Motorcycles
Crown Motor Company
Dewan Farooque Motors
DYL Motorcycles
Fateh Motors
Ghandhara Industries
Ghandhara Nissan
Ghani Automobile Industries
Hinopak Motors
Honda Atlas Cars Pakistan
Indus Motors Company
Karakoram Motors
Kausar Automobiles
Master Motors
Millat Tractors
Omega Industries
Pak Suzuki
Plum Qingqi Motors
Raazy Motors Industries
Ravi Motorcycles
Orient Automotive
Sazgar
Sigma Motors
Sohrab Cycles
Super Asia Motors
United Motorcycles
Volvo Pakistan
Yamaha Motor Pakistan

See also
Automobile industry in Pakistan

References

Motor trade associations
Trade associations based in Pakistan
Automotive industry in Pakistan